Memecylon varians is a species of plant in the family Melastomataceae. It is endemic to Sri Lanka.

References

varians
Vulnerable plants
Endemic flora of Sri Lanka
Taxonomy articles created by Polbot